Ponte da Barca is a municipality in the district of Viana do Castelo in Portugal. The population in 2011 was 12,061, in an area of 182.11 km2.

The present Mayor is Augusto Manuel Dos Reis Marinho, elected by the PSD. The municipal holiday is August 24.

Climate
Ponte da Barca has a Mediterranean climate with oceanic/humid subtropical influences. It has warm to hot summers and mild, very wet winters.

Parishes

Administratively, the municipality is divided into 17 civil parishes (freguesias):

 Azias
 Boivães
 Bravães
 Britelo
 Crasto, Ruivos e Grovelas
 Cuide de Vila Verde
 Entre Ambos-os-Rios, Ermida e Germil
 Lavradas
 Lindoso
 Nogueira
 Oleiros
 Ponte da Barca, Vila Nova da Muía e Paço Vedro de Magalhães
 Sampriz
 Vade São Pedro
 Vade São Tomé
 Touvedo (São Lourenço e Salvador)
 Vila Chã (São João Baptista e Santiago)

Notable people 
 João Uva (born 1980) a former rugby union footballer 
 Adérito Esteves (born Sanpriz, Ponte da Barca 1985) a Portuguese rugby union player.

References

External links
 Municipality official website
 Casa do Javali and Casa da Corca
 Sanctuary of Our Lady of Peace 

 
Municipalities of Viana do Castelo District